The Sisters of Perpetual Indulgence (SPI), also called Order of Perpetual Indulgence (OPI) is a charity, protest, and street performance organization that uses drag and religious imagery to call attention to sexual intolerance and satirizes issues of gender and morality. Upon their move to San Francisco from Iowa City in 1979, a small group of gay men in San Francisco began wearing the attire of nuns in visible situations using camp to draw attention to social conflicts and problems in the Castro District.

The Sisters have grown throughout the U.S., Canada, Australia, Europe, and South America, and are currently organized as an international network of orders, which are mostly non-profit charity organizations that raise money for AIDS, LGBT-related causes, and mainstream community service organizations, while promoting safer sex and educating others about the harmful effects of drug use and other risky behaviors. In San Francisco alone where they continue to be the most active, between 1979 and 2007 the Sisters are credited with raising over $1 million for various causes, or almost $40,000 on average per year.

Early members of the group, while not hiding their masculine features or facial hair, are characterized by San Francisco gay community historian Susan Stryker as the embodiment of "genderfuck". Their appearance has changed over the years; the nun motif remains the same, but it has been joined with exaggerated make-up that accentuates the rebellion against gender roles and religion.

Inception

The Sisters of Perpetual Indulgence made their first appearance on Castro Street in San Francisco in 1979. Their approach and appearance was not new or extraordinary for the place or time. Starting in the 1960s, the Castro District began transitioning from a working class Irish Catholic district going through significant economic decline. A gay bar opened on Market Street and gradually, gay men began to migrate to the neighborhood. By 1977, between 100,000 and 200,000 had moved to San Francisco from all over the United States, changing the political and cultural profile of the city. The migration created a gay community in the city with enough political clout to elect a gay representative to city government, Harvey Milk.

Two theater troupes, The Cockettes and the Angels of Light, formed in San Francisco in the late 1960s and focused their entertainment on mocking popular culture through drag, embracing drugs, and free sex in the counterculture of the 1960s. The Cockettes performed regularly at the Palace Theater in the city's North Beach district as part of the late-night "Nocturnal Emissions" series and developed a strong following that would also dress in drag and ascribe to recreational drug use at their shows. One of their more high-profile performances was a parodic recreation of the 1971 wedding of Tricia Nixon—President Nixon's daughter—and Edward F. Cox, both characters of course played by men in women's clothes. Director John Waters called the Cockettes "hippie acid freak drag queens", whose first non-San Francisco appearance was at a New York City show with an audience full of celebrities who reacted with complete confusion to the performance. With their rising success came philosophical differences with The Angels of Light who broke off to present free shows, but who similarly employed drag and theater to satirize issues of gender and morality. The Angels of Light first appeared in a mock nativity scene at Grace Cathedral's Christmas Eve midnight mass in 1970. Both groups employed a sense of high camp: outrageous scenes and sets, fantastic costumes, movie references and bad puns, and intentionally bad acting combined with deliberately bad drag, which diverted from previous female impersonators whose mark of quality was realism.

The Castro was also known for the outrageous characters who were 1970s mainstays, such as Jesus Christ Satan and The Cosmic Lady, who endeared themselves to local residents with their unique perspectives, particularly during street events such as the Castro Street Fair and Halloween in the Castro. On Easter weekend 1979, three men dressed as nuns with habits they had procured from a convent in Iowa under the guise that they were going to stage a presentation of The Sound of Music, made their appearance on Castro Street. They followed with appearances at a nude beach, a softball game and the annual Castro Street Fair.

At the same time, religious participation in politics appeared in the late 1970s with the activism of Anita Bryant, and Jerry Falwell's establishment of the Moral Majority. The Castro District had been publicized nationally as a major gay neighborhood and was targeted by several dozen church members who took weekly trips to preach to the residents about the immorality of homosexuality. In August 1980, a dozen men dressed in 14th century Belgian nun's robes and habits, and according to one participant using the name Sister Missionary Position, "a teensy bit of make-up so as not to be dowdy on a Friday night", met the proselytizers where a chase ensued and attracted an audience of gay supporters who heckled the preachers until they left.

In October 1980, the dozen or so erstwhile nuns held their first fundraiser, a bingo game and salsa dance that was well-attended in large part because of the write-up in The San Francisco Chronicle by Herb Caen the same day, who printed their organization name, the Sisters of Perpetual Indulgence. The benefit was for San Francisco's Metropolitan Community Church Cuban Refugee Program, and it netted $1,500 ($ in 2009). The Sisters began making regular appearances at Castro events that focused on sexual tolerance or provided a showcase for drag. They also developed a mission statement:The Sisters of Perpetual Indulgence is a leading-edge Order of queer nuns. Since our first appearance in San Francisco on Easter Sunday, 1979, the Sisters have devoted ourselves to community service, ministry and outreach to those on the edges, and to promoting human rights, respect for diversity and spiritual enlightenment. We believe all people have a right to express their unique joy and beauty and we use humor and irreverent wit to expose the forces of bigotry, complacency and guilt that chain the human spirit.

Structure and methods

Members of the Sisters of Perpetual Indulgence include people who identify with a variety of sexual orientations and genders, although the majority are gay men. Joining an order mirrors the steps for joining an actual order of nuns. Potential members are encouraged to attend organizational meetings as aspirants, and told that if they are not intending to make a lifelong commitment they should seriously reconsider. After showing intent and being approved by the order, an aspirant is promoted to a postulant and is expected to learn about the history of the organization and continue to work behind the scenes for at least six months. Postulants are not allowed to wear nun's attire, but may instead dress in "festive garb that fits in with Order", according to the Sisters' website. If the members approve of the postulant, a fully indoctrinated member may act as a sponsor and the postulant is promoted to a novice. Novices are allowed to wear white veils and whiteface make-up. This phase lasts another six months during which the novice is expected to work within the organization and plan an event. If three-fourths of the order agrees, the novice is promoted to a full member of the group.

After their inception, the Sisters soon spread to other cities within the U.S. as a loosely connected network of mostly autonomous houses. There are thirteen houses and six missions in various cities across the U.S. Globally, 600 members work for established houses or missions in Australia, Canada, Colombia, France, Germany, Scotland, Switzerland, the United Kingdom, and Uruguay. Chapters founded outside the United States would also become involved in local issues. Whilst the United Kingdom chapter was involved in protests against police hostility towards the lesbian and gay community and safe-sex education, the chapter was also involved in campaigning unrelated to LGBT+ issues, such as protests against Poll Tax, the Gulf War, and the 1984-85 Miner's Strike.
The San Francisco Founding House anchors much of the activities and continues to be the largest and most well-funded. The San Francisco House (SPI, Inc.) also holds the registered trademarks for "Sisters of Perpetual Indulgence" and the "laughing nun head" logo.

Only in San Francisco could the Sisters of Perpetual Indulgence not only make their first appearance, but become interwoven in the cultural and political fabric of the city, according to scholar Cathy Glenn in the journal Theory and Event. Glenn uses the examples of San Francisco as a society of hyperpluralism, where all the groups who have called the city their home have successfully maintained their individual identities, creating a culture defined by counterculture and at times marked by political violence. The Sisters use Catholic imagery as simultaneous inspiration and fodder for parody through camp. They choose names based on the process of renaming women inducted into Catholic orders, but that suggest sexual promiscuity or that are based in absurdity: Sister Anita Blowjob, Sister GladAss of the Joyous Reserectum, Sister Hellena Handbasket, Sister Sensible Shoes, and Sister Homo Celestial, among others. They wear wimples, habits, and robes of nuns, but accessorize them garishly with baubles, beads, and whiteface make-up. Sister Phyllis Stein, the Fragrant Mistress of Sistory, asserts that there is a clear distinction between drag queens and members of the Sisters of Perpetual Indulgence: "We're not dressed as girls, we're dressed as nuns... We definitely minister to the spiritual needs of our community, while drag queens sort of focus on camp and fun within our communities. We're very different communities. A lot of people refer to us as drag queens, but we say we're in nun drag. We are nuns."

Sister Irma Geddon of the Portland, Oregon-based Order of Benevolent Bliss offered her view of the efficacy of using nun's clothing and drag: "The lightness of everything, in addition to the whiteface and the nun's habits, are a mechanism to reach out to people. When we're dressed up like that, kind of like sacred clowns, it allows people to interact with us."

Activism

AIDS education

The organization of the Sisters of Perpetual Indulgence occurred at the same time HIV/AIDS began appearing in the Castro District and New York City. Ironically, safe havens during this crisis came in the form of bars such Maud's and Amelia's, which were shut down. Some theories of why they were shut down included a feeling of separation between male gays bars and lesbian bars, so mostly lesbian bars were being shut down. The AIDS crisis sprouted a clean and sober mentality which drove the number of bars down since people believed that bars were places were everyone had AIDS or could get it very easily. Some of the earliest attempts to bring attention to the new disease were staged by the Sisters, both in and out of costume. In 1982, Sister Florence Nightmare, RN (early AIDS activist and registered nurse Bobbi Campbell) and Sister Roz Erection (Baruch Golden, a registered nurse) joined with a team of Sisters and medical professionals to create "Play Fair!", the first safer sex pamphlet to use plain language, practical advice and humor, and considered by one of the founders to be "one of the Order's greatest achievements in community education and support". In 1999, for the Sisters' 20th anniversary the pamphlet was revised. The Sisters worldwide continue to raise awareness of sexual health; many Orders regularly pass out condoms and participate in events to educate people on sexual health issues.

Campbell appeared on the cover of Newsweek declaring himself to be the "AIDS poster boy" in 1983. He was active in AIDS education and prevention and split his appearances as himself and Sister Florence Nightmare until his death in 1984. He and three other Castro residents started the AIDS Candlelight Memorial. Losing several members to AIDS in the early 1980s, the Sisters' presence at the 1986 Castro Street Fair was accomplished with less than a dozen members who sponsored a fund-raising and safer sex education booth that featured pie throwing with the slogan "Cream yer Sister, not yer lover!"

Members of the Sisters of Perpetual Indulgence who have died are referred by the Sisters as "Nuns of the Above". Specific losses due to AIDS are immortalized in the folk art NAMES Project AIDS Memorial Quilt. Created in the 1985 the quilt has made history several times. It was featured at the 1996 NAMES quilt display in Washington, D.C. in front of the U.S. House of Representatives and was among the first quilts viewed by then Vice President Al Gore and his wife Tipper Gore and later featured in the NAMES Projects' calendar worldwide. The Nuns of The Above quilt itself has been flown around the United States and is in high demand for local displays. While in town for the AIDS Memorial Quilt display the Sisters led an exorcism of homophobia, classism, and racism on the steps of the United States House of Representatives, and assisted with the AIDS Coalition to Unleash Power (ACT-UP) death march and protest, to the gates of the White House where ashes of people who had died from AIDS were illegally spread on the lawn.

Political activism and protest

In 1982, Jack Fertig, known as Sister Boom Boom, ran for San Francisco Board of Supervisors earning over 23,000 votes with her occupation listed as "Nun of the Above". San Francisco passed a law soon after, commonly called the "Sister Boom Boom Law", that all people running for office had to do so with their legal name.

Outlined as one of the Sisters' missions "to promulgate universal joy and to expiate stigmatic guilt", the Sisters of Perpetual Indulgence have a history of bringing attention to conservative movements that attempt to shame members of the LGBT community or people with HIV/AIDS. Sisters performed a public exorcism of anti-feminist Phyllis Schlafly that was deliberately timed to take place at Union Square during the 1984 Democratic National Convention, taking place in San Francisco. A Sister dressed as Schlafly was held down as another spoke to the crowd, and other Sisters pulled out rubber snakes from the mock-Schlafly's clothing. Also taking place was Jerry Falwell's Family Forum, hosted by the Moral Majority whose major planks focused on condemning homosexuality, pornography, and abortion. A Sister dressed as Falwell was undressed during the performance to reveal fishnet stockings and a corset in front of an audience of 2,000.

In 1987, their Castro Street Fair presence was a protest of the rhetoric of Lyndon LaRouche, a California politician who advocated for quarantines for people living with AIDS. The Sisters covered their costumes with "Stop LaRouche" buttons, selling them as they mingled in the crowd to raise money for San Francisco General Hospital's AIDS ward. The same year the Sisters held another mock exorcism, this time of Pope John Paul II, coinciding with his visit to San Francisco, calling it the "Official San Francisco Papal Welcoming Committee". The Pope's visit stressed relations between Catholics and gays when Cardinal Ratzinger released an open letter from the Vatican clarifying the Church's position on homosexuality and recent events in San Francisco. The Bay Area Reporter, a local gay weekly newspaper, summarized the intent with their headline, "Pope to Gays: 'Drop Dead' ", and took greatest offense with the Vatican's points that gays cause the violence against them, and that they were primarily responsible for the AIDS crisis. The Sisters claim the action, also taking place in Union Square, earned the organization a spot on the Papal List of Heretics.

Continuing the tradition, members of the San Diego Order have made a presence at a Christian fundamentalist youth revival meeting called Teen Mania Ministries from 2006 to 2008. Sisters Iona Dubble-Wyde and Freeda Sole stood outside the Cox Arena in full regalia to intercept pastors and attendees. The responses from the children and adolescents were varied. While some told the Sisters they were going to hell, others asked questions and offered thanks and hugs; the event was generally reported as positive.

Halloween

Celebrated even when the Castro was predominantly an Irish Catholic family neighborhood, as the demographics transformed, Halloween in the Castro became a major city event, described by author David Skal as "gay high holy day", attracting thousands of outsiders. On October 31, 1989, two weeks after San Francisco was devastated by the 6.9 MW Loma Prieta earthquake, the Sisters used donation buckets to collect thousands of dollars for the mayor's Earthquake Relief Fund from the Halloween crowds that poured into the Castro neighborhood for the massive street party.

The next year, the Sisters, with the San Francisco Gay Men's Chorus and a group named Community United against Violence, took over the organization of the event for the next five years, drawing larger crowds and collecting for AIDS charities. By 1994 between 300,000 and 400,000 people attended the event. Controlling excesses became too difficult. Violence escalated, claimed by Dahn Van Laarz (Sister Dana van Iquity) to be the result of inebriated gawkers motivated by homophobia. When the police confiscated an AK-47 from a reveler trying to gain access to Castro Street, and they reported that 50 to 60 people had been arrested, the Sisters decided to move the celebration and Halloween in the Castro ended. The next year, the Sisters hosted a costume-mandatory dance named HallowQueen in a South of Market gay nightclub, which raised over $6,000 for charity.

A decade later the city was still struggling to manage the Halloween event. In 2006 nine people were wounded when a gunman opened fire at the celebration; it was canceled in 2007. The Sisters continued to organize private and safe events, raising money every year for charity. Without city funds they managed to keep the chaos under control by providing entertainment and structure. Their abilities for staging and running large events has kept them in demand as event organizers and advisers.

Community involvement

The Sisters have been involved in various causes, including the promotion of safer sex, raising money for HIV/AIDS and breast cancer research, the Gay Games, Haight Ashbury Free Clinics, and raising the "first legal $1000" for a city proposition to legalize medical marijuana. Sister Roma organized a "Stop the Violence" campaign in the Castro where the Sisters distributed placards in homes and businesses to signify which were safe places to go, and whistles to be used to alert those nearby in case of attack. They have sponsored dances for LGBT youth, and given to or worked for a variety of similar objectives.

Conflicts

Religious parodies

Using their attire to parody nuns and religious sacraments, some actions by the Sisters of Perpetual Indulgence have offended Catholics. As early as 1982 the Catholic Church in San Francisco protested the methods of the Sisters, particularly when they attended an interfaith prayer service at St. Mary's Cathedral. Balking at the stage names of Sister Hysterectoria and Sister Boom Boom, an editorial in a local Catholic magazine named the Monitor stated, "The organization, their names, and their use of religious habits is an affront to religious women and Catholics in general".

Starting in 1995, the Sisters began a Castro Crawl on Easter Sunday to celebrate their anniversary. The event features a 13-stop pub crawl that parodies Stations of the Cross. At each station in front of a gay bar or similarly affiliated organization, the Sisters call out "We adore thee, O Christ" to be answered by their traveling audience in "Luvya, mean it, let's do brunch". Actors portray the Virgin Mary, Mary Magdalene, and other people integral to Easter traditions, and the Sisters continue to educate for safer sex by passing out condoms, ending the event with a toast of vanilla wafers and Jägermeister.

In 1999, San Francisco Supervisor Tom Ammiano caused  conflict with some of the city's Catholic community when the Board of Supervisors, at Ammiano's request, granted the Sisters a permit to close a block of Castro Street for their 20th anniversary celebration on Easter Sunday, that included a "Hunky Jesus" contest among other activities.  San Francisco's archdiocese requested the event be moved to another day. The city's Interfaith Council suggested the following Sunday, which was the Eastern Orthodox Easter. An Archdiocese newspaper compared the Sisters' event to neo-Nazis celebrating on the Jewish holiday of Passover. The controversy sparked a flurry of responses in The San Francisco Chronicle letters to the editor. The Anti-Defamation League wrote to reply that such a characterization was offensive and "trivializes the horrific actions of hate groups" while others reflected offense at the sacrilege of the Sisters' actions and other writers merely wondered what the fuss was about. The resulting attention ensured a crowd of 5,000 attendees and what the Sisters claimed to be a million dollars of free publicity. In actuality, the event raised about $13,000 for the Tenderloin AIDS Resource Center and the San Francisco LGBT Community Center, among various groups.

The Sisters were featured in a 2008 book titled Catholic and Queer where they explained that their mode of dress was meant not only to employ the "fabulous attire" that had been forsaken by Catholic non-cloistered orders, but that their dedication to community service is an attempt to "honor and emulate [the] unstinting devotion" of Roman Catholic nuns who work within their neighborhoods.

The Reno Pride

In August 1999, the Sisters were invited to be parade grand marshals at Reno's first Pride Parade. Nevada's Republican Governor Kenny Guinn, who had signed a bill in May outlawing discrimination against gays and lesbians in Nevada, refused to sign a proclamation in support of the parade, over concerns that the group "tends to cross the line of decency and appropriateness and would conduct themselves in a manner that would offend people of different religious groups".

Saints and angels
Over the years the Sisters have named as saints hundreds of people who have helped on various projects behind the scenes organizing, coordinating actions or projects, performing at events as an artist or emcee or even serving the greater LGBT community. Rarely but sometimes they canonize community heroes who have recently died. It is customary for the Sisters to award sainthood with the addition of an elaborate "saint name". Notable saints include:
 Assassinated San Francisco Supervisor Harvey Milk
 California State Senator Carole Migden
 Gavin Newsom, Mayor of San Francisco (later lieutenant governor and then governor of California)
 Jason West, Mayor of New Paltz, New York
 San Francisco Supervisors Tom Ammiano and Bevan Dufty
 Ed Rosenthal, Marijuana rights activist 
 Susan Leal, General Manager of the San Francisco Public Utilities Commission
 Harry Hay, founder of the radical faeries
 authors Armistead Maupin and Tonne Serah
 actresses Margaret Cho, Kathy Griffin, Ethel Merman and Rosie O'Donnell
 Dr. Elizabeth Stuart, Professor of Christian Theology at King Alfred's College, Winchester
 medical marijuana activist Brownie Mary
 film maker and artist Derek Jarman
 French photographer Jean-Baptiste Carhaix 
 Mabel Teng, former City Assessor-Recorder of San Francisco
 community activists and organizers:
 Michael Brandon
 Molly McKay and Davina Kotulski
 Tony Buff, Mr. Leather Washington 2002
 Saint Mr. Sister Violet, RN, Emerald Shepard of Crazy Girls and Healer of Those in Need, 2014
 Jackie Forster
 Peter Tatchell
 Greg Day, San Francisco photographer who documented the early Sisters
 Tony Whitehead, the first Chair of the Terrence Higgins Trust, the largest AIDS charity in Europe
 Ian Campbell Dunn 
 Lisa Power
 Sharley McLean
 community drag icons and activists:
 Juanita More
 Trauma Flintstone
 Connie Champagne actor, vocalist and activist
 Donna Sachet
 Heklina
 Peaches Christ

The Sisters also award the title of "angels" to those non-members who make contributions to the SPI in some way.

Awards
In 2015 the Sisters received the Vice President's Award from the National Leather Association International.

See also

 Counterculture
 Gay Shame
 Gender bender
 New York City Drag March
 Non-binary gender
 Parody religion
 Pink Saturday
 Radical Faeries
 Religious satire

References

Bibliography
de Jim, Strange (2003). San Francisco's Castro, Arcadia Publishing. 
Ellwood, Mark; Edwards, Nick (2009).The Rough Guide to San Francisco & the Bay Area (Rough Guide Travel Guides), Penguin. 
Evans, Annie; Healey, Trebor (2008). Queer and Catholic, Routledge. 
Leyland, Winston, ed (2002). Out In the Castro: Desire, Promise, Activism, Leyland Publications. 
Shilts, Randy (1987). And the Band Played On, St. Martin's Press. 
Stryker, Susan; Van Buskirk, Jim (1996). Gay By the Bay: A History of Queer Culture in the San Francisco Bay Area, Chronicle Books. 
 Turan, Kenneth (2005). Never Coming to a Theater Near You: A Celebration of a Certain Kind of Movie, PublicAffairs. 
 Wilcox, Melissa (2018). Queer Nuns: Religion, Activism, and Serious Parody, New York University Press.

External links

American drag queens
American satirists
Anti-Catholicism in the United States
American community activists
Culture of San Francisco
Service organizations based in the United States
Gay culture in the United States
History of LGBT civil rights in the United States
LGBT and Catholicism
LGBT culture in San Francisco
LGBT history in San Francisco
LGBT political advocacy groups in the United States
Non-profit organizations based in California
Organizations established in 1979
Performance artist collectives
Drag groups
1979 in LGBT history
1979 establishments in California